Mithridatocetus is a genus of cetotheriid mysticete in the subfamily Cetotheriinae. Known specimens have been found in marine deposits in Crimea, Ukraine, and the Russian Caucasus.

References 

Baleen whales
Prehistoric cetacean genera
Miocene cetaceans
Miocene mammals of Europe
Fossils of Russia
Fossil taxa described in 2016